Operation Yodel was an operation launched by the Rhodesian security forces on 13 September 1966 in response to an attack on civilians executed by communist insurgents who crossed over the border from Zambia into Rhodesia.

References

Biography

Yodel
Yodel
September 1966 events in Africa
1966 in Rhodesia